Luohe (postal: Loho) is a prefecture-level city in central Henan province, China. It is surrounded by the cities of Xuchang, Zhoukou, Zhumadian and Pingdingshan on its north, east, south and west respectively. Its population was 2,367,490 inhabitants at the 2020 Chinese census whom 1,326,687 lived in the built-up (or metro) area made up of Yancheng, Shaoling and Yuanhui districts.

Administration
The prefecture level city of Luohe directly administers 3 districts and 2 counties, which themselves administer 7 subdistricts, 49 towns and townships, 1,262 villages, and 78 residential communities.

Geography
Luohe spans parts of central and southern Henan Province, spanning from 113°27′E to 114°16′E in terms of longitude, and from 33°24′N to 33°59′N in terms of latitude. The city is located near the Funiu Mountains and the Huaibei Plains, and the city's 81 different rivers are all a part of the Huai River system.

Climate

Economy
Consistent with the broader trends of China's economic expansion, Luohe city has reported consistent GDP growth throughout the 2010s. Luohe is also famous for being home to Nanjie Village, which has gained fame due to its Maoist-styled collective-ownership.

Agriculture 
The city's main agricultural products include wheat, corn, cotton, peanut oil, vegetables, mushrooms, melons, and fruit. The city is famous for its ham production industry. WH Group, the world's largest pork producer in the world, and owner of Smithfield Foods, has its Chinese headquarters in Luohe.

Natural resources 
Much of Luohe's natural resources come from the rivers of the city. The city's rivers are bountiful with rock salt of a high enough grade to be used in food preparation. The rivers of the city also have a particular type of sand which is suitable for being used in building materials.

Industry 
A commercial center since ancient times, Luohe presently is home to many light industries such as food preparation, textile production, plastic production, and shoe production. Heavy industries, such as cement production, are also present.

Services 
The city's tertiary industry has grown in recent years faster than overall economy. As of 2018, the city's tertiary industry had an output of 38.44 billion Yuan, 31.1% of the city's total.

Education 
In 2018, Luohe City's secondary vocational education enrolled 9,200 students (excluding technical schools), with 27,800 students and 8,100 graduates. Regular high schools have 15,900 students, 47,400 students and 15,500 graduates. There are 35,100 students enrolled in junior high schools, 98,900 students and 30,500 graduates. Primary school enrollment was 35,500, with 205,700 students and 34,800 graduates. There are 98,100 kids in kindergartens.

Notable people
 Xu Shen: famous scholar during the Han Dynasty. He compiled the first Chinese character dictionary Shuowen Jiezi.

References

External links
Government website of Luohe (in Simplified Chinese)

Cities in Henan
Prefecture-level divisions of Henan
National Forest Cities in China